Bangladesh Academy for Rural Development (BARD) Bangladesh Academy for Rural Development (BARD) started its journey on 27 May 1959 as a Training, Research and Action Research institute in rural development. The founder director of this academy dedicated to the leadership of Dr. Akhtar Hameed Khan, some researchers carried out continuous experiments with rural people and developed some model programs for rural development in this country. In the early sixties, the problems that were prevalent in rural areas were identified. The priorities of these programs are:

1. Creating a sustainable organization in the village,

2. Creating personal and collective capital,

3. Infrastructure development,

4. Expansion of advanced agricultural technology,

5. Expansion of social development activities including health, education, family planning, women's education,

6. Creating an organized village society with the help of people from all levels of the village,

7. Employment for landless laborers in non-agricultural sector,

8. Establish effective communication with the village and the outside world and

9. Innovation is an effective way to reach government service villages.

In order to effectively implement these six priorities, the Academy took initiative in the sixties.

 

BARD is an autonomous organization under the Department of Rural Development and Cooperatives of the Ministry of Local Government, Rural Development and Cooperatives. The Board is governed by a 21-member Board of Directors whose Chairman is the Honorable Minister of the Ministry of Local Government, Rural Development and Cooperatives. The director general serves as the chief executive of the academy, to which an additional director general and nine directors provide assistance. All the activities of the Academy are conducted through nine departments, with one director acting as the head. BARD gained fame at home and abroad for the “Cumilla Model” of rural development invented by the Academy. BARD received the “Shadhinata Padak” in the Year 1986 for his special contribution to rural development. The number of officers and employees of the BARD is 365.

The academy is known for implementing the Comilla Model in the 1960s that has been internationally recognised as a model project for rural development in the developing countries.

Foundation

East Pakistan Academy for Rural Development was established in 1959 in Comilla as EPARD under the initiative of Dr Akhtar Hameed Khan who became the institution's founder-Director. After the Bangladesh War of Independence, the institution was renamed to its present form.

Location

The academy is located at Kotbari, 10 km from Comilla town. The campus is spread over a vast area that also hosts residences, conference rooms, mosque, library, a health clinic, sports complex, and other amenities.

Objectives

One of the main functions of BARD is to provide training for both officials and non-official members of the public and private institutions working on rural development. The training is provided in the form of courses, visit programmes, workshops and seminars.

Research

The research is basically aimed at collecting socioeconomic data for planning and project preparation. Findings are also used for training and information materials by respective public bodies and planning institutions. Research also relate to the evaluation of national rural development programmes either independently or jointly with government agencies, universities and research organisations.

Projects

Since its inception BARD has conducted a number of large and small scales development programmes.
 TCCA - In the 1960s the academy evolved a new system of rural cooperatives where small farmers of Comilla sadar thana were organised into primary cooperatives in the form of the federation of Thana Central Cooperative Association. The model has been successfully replicated all over the country.
 The Thana Training and Development Centre (TTDC) (since 1962–63) is a model of decentralised and coordinated rural administration for development. Subsequently, it was renamed as Rural Works Programme (RWP).
 1969, Thana Irrigation Programme.

Board of Governors (BOG)

Board of Governors (BOG) of Bangladesh Academy for Rural Development (BARD) has consisted of 21 (twenty-one) individuals. There are one President, one vice-president, 14 (fourteen) members, 4 (four) nominated members, and one secretariat member. President is selected a minister from the Ministry of Local Government, Rural Development and Co-operatives. And vice-president is elected from Rural Development and Co-operative Division. Other members are selected and nominated from the different Ministries, Divisions, and Institutes. There is included a table of BOG. Such as:-

See also
 Rural Development Academy, Sherpur, Bogra
 List of Educational Institutions in Comilla

References

External links 

 
 

Recipients of the Independence Day Award
Organisations based in Comilla
Rural development in Bangladesh